Sphaerolobium validum is a species of flowering plant in the family Fabaceae and is endemic to the south of Western Australia. It was first formally described in 2001 by Ryonen Butcher in Australian Systematic Botany from specimens collected near Jerramungup in 1999. The specific epithet (validum) means "strong" or "stout".

Sphaerolobium validum grows in undulating areas, on flats and on roadsides in the Esperance Plains and Mallee bioregions of southern Western Australia. It is listed as "Priority Three" by the Government of Western Australia Department of Biodiversity, Conservation and Attractions, meaning that it is poorly known and known from only a few locations but is not under imminent threat.

References

validum
Eudicots of Western Australia
Plants described in 2001